Nuvve.. Nuvve...  is a 2002 Indian Telugu-language romance film written and directed by Trivikram Srinivas. The film starred Tarun, Shriya Saran, and Prakash Raj in important lead roles. Upon release, the film and the soundtrack received rave reviews, and has garnered two state Nandi Awards, and a Filmfare Award South. The film was subsequently dubbed into Marathi as Shahane Saasarebuva by B4U Marathi and in Malayalam as  Pranayamay.

Plot
Anjali (Shriya Saran) is the daughter of a millionaire Vishwanath (Prakash Raj) who loves his daughter very much. So much that he even buys her an Icecream Parlor when his daughter asks him for an ice cream. What Vishwanath expects is a son-in-law who will never oppose him in any matter. Rishi (Tarun) hails from a middle-class family. His father, played by Chandramohan, owns a department store. He is a good-hearted but happy-go-lucky guy. Anjali happens to join the college in which Rishi is a senior. Soon, they fall in love with each other. On one occasion, Rishi takes Anjali to Mumbai for dinner. Anjali tries to shake off the issue with her father, saying that she was with one of her friends. But unfortunately, Vishwanath calls that friend up when Anjali was missing. He tells him that Anjali went to Mumbai with someone called Rishi. This is enough for Vishwanath's suspicion to rise that Anjali has fallen in love. He asks Rishi to prove his worth and asks him in some way to earn any money so that he can support Anjali, who he has brought up in riches. When Rishi refuses to comply, he gives Rishi one crore rupees to forget his daughter. Rishi takes it and then later gives it back, insulting Viswanath, and tries to prove that his love is greater than everything and money can't buy his love. To retaliate, Vishwanath insults Rishi's family by getting a beggar for marriage with Rishi's sister to try to convey to them the pain he must feel. Rishi then creates a scene in Viswanath's office beating up security guy and destroying computers in the office, Rishi clarifies that in the proposal that beggar be married to Rishi's sister there is no love between the two, but Rishi and Anjali love each other. Anjali starts to show more feelings for Rishi. Worried, Vishwanath tries to set Anjali's marriage with another guy. Anjali meets Rishi at his home and requests him to marry her right at the moment, but Rishi convinces Anjali that this is not the right way. Rishi takes her back to her home, there Rishi challenges Vishwanath that if getting Anjali married to some one else is right then that marriage can't be stopped, but if it is wrong then that marriage cannot happen. Consequent incidents make Vishwanath realize his mistakes and the arranged marriage fails while Viswanath marries Anjali to Rishi.

Cast
 Tarun as Rishi
 Shriya Saran as Anjali
 Prakash Raj as Viswanath
 Chandra Mohan as Rishi's father
 Rajiv Kanakala as Anjali's brother
 Sunil as Pandu
 Anitha Chowdary as Anjali's sister-in-law
 M. S. Narayana as Police Constable
 Sudha as Rishi's mother
 Pragathi as Anjali's mother
 Madhumitha as Anjali's friend
 Tanikella Bharani as Abu, Viswanath's friend
 Dharmavarapu Subramanyam as Gentleman Sir
 Shilpa Chakraborty as Priya, collegemate of Rishi
 Shopkeeper as Gundu Sudarshan
 Customer at Grocery Shop as Junior Relangi

Awards
Filmfare Awards South
 Best Supporting Actor - Prakash Raj

Nandi Awards
 Second Best Feature Film - Silver - Sravanthi Ravi Kishore
 Best Dialogue Writer - Trivikram Srinivas

References

External links
 

2002 films
Films directed by Trivikram Srinivas
2000s Telugu-language films
Indian romantic drama films
Films scored by Koti
2002 directorial debut films
2002 romantic drama films